The Cook County, Illinois, general election was held on November 3, 1998.

Primaries were held March 17, 1998.

Elections were held for Assessor, Clerk, Sheriff, Treasurer, President of the Cook County Board of Commissioners, all 17 seats of the Cook County Board of Commissioners, all 3 seats of the Cook County Board of Review, 4 seats on the Water Reclamation District Board, and judgeships on the Circuit Court of Cook County.

Election information
1998 was a midterm election year in the United States. The primaries and general elections for Cook County races coincided with those for federal (Senate and House) and those for state elections.

Voter turnout

Primary election
Voter turnout in Cook County during the primaries was 28.68%.

On its own, suburban Cook County saw 23.95% turnout.

General election
The general election saw 54.61% turnout, with 1,433,423 ballots cast. Chicago saw 752,506 ballots cast while suburban Cook County saw 53.95% turnout (with 680,917 ballots cast).

Assessor 

In the 1998 Cook County Assessor election, incumbent assessor James Houlihan, a Democrat, was elected to his first full-term. Houlihan had been appointed to the office in 1997, after Thomas Hynes (who had serve as Cook County assessor since 1978) opted to resign from the office.

Primaries

Democratic

Republican

General election

Clerk 

In the 1998 Cook County Clerk election, incumbent second-term clerk David Orr, a Democrat, was reelected.

Primaries

Democratic

Republican

General election

Sheriff 

In the 1998 Cook County Sheriff election, incumbent second-term sheriff Michael F. Sheahan, a Democrat, was reelected.

Primaries

Democratic

Republican
Former Superintendent of the Chicago Police Department LeRoy Martin won the Republican primary.

General election

Treasurer 

In the 1998 Cook County Treasurer election, incumbent sixth-term treasurer Edward J. Rosewell, a Democrat, did not seek reelection after having been indicted over a ghost jobs scheme (for which he would ultimately plead guilty). Cook County Commissioner Maria Pappas was elected to succeed him.

Primaries

Democratic

Republican

General election

President of the Cook County Board of Commissioners 

In the 1998 President of the Cook County Board of Commissioners election, incumbent first-term president John Stroger, a Democrat, was reelected.

Primaries

Democratic
Incumbent John H. Stroger, Jr. defeated Cook County commissioner Calvin R. Sutker.

Republican
Clerk of the Circuit Court of Cook County Aurelia Pucinski left the Democratic Party and joined the Republican party in December 1997 to run as its nominee for President of the Cook County Board of Commissioners.

General election

Cook County Board of Commissioners 

The 1998 Cook County Board of Commissioners election saw all seventeen seats of the Cook County Board of Commissioners up for election to four-year terms.

1st district

Incumbent commissioner Darlena Williams-Burnett, a Democrat appointed in 1997 after fellow Democrat Danny K. Davis resigned to serve in the United States House of Representatives, lost renomination in the Democratic primary to Earlean Collins. Collins would go on to win the general election.

Primaries

Democratic

Republican

General election

2nd district

Incumbent third-term commissioner Bobbie L. Steele, a Democrat, was reelected, running unopposed in both the primary and general election.

Primaries

Democratic

Republican
No candidates ran in the Republican primary.

General election

3rd district

Incumbent commissioner Jerry Butler, a Democrat who first assumed office in 1985, was reelected.

Primaries

Democratic

Republican

General election

4th district

Incumbent commissioner John Stroger, a Democrat, was reelected, running unopposed in both the Democratic primary and general election.

Primaries

Democratic

Republican
No candidates ran in the Republican primary.

General election

5th district

Incumbent first-term commissioner Deborah Sims, a Democrat, was reelected.

Primaries

Democratic

Republican
No candidates ran in the Republican primary.

General election

6th district

Incumbent first-term commissioner Bud Fleming, a Republican, unsuccessfully sought reelection, being unseated by Democratic nominee William Moran. Moran's victory of Flemming was considered an upset victory. Before winning this race, Moran had been regarded as a perennial candidate.

Primaries

Democratic
William Moran, who had never held office, defeated John David Desimone, who had served as President of the Chicago Heights Park District since 1995.

Republican

General election

7th district

Incumbent first-term commissioner Joseph Mario Moreno, a Democrat, was reelected.

Primaries

Democratic

Republican

General election
Republican primary winner Irma C. Lopez was replaced on the ballot by Alberto Alva.

8th district

Incumbent first-term commissioner Roberto Maldonado, a Democrat, was reelected, running unopposed in both the primary and general election.

Primaries

Democratic
Incumbent Roberto Maldono was challenged by Francisco Duprey, who had served as the director of school services for Chicago Public Schools and had also led Chicago's Department of Economic Development.

Republican
No candidates ran in the Republican primary.

General election

9th district

Incumbent first-term commissioner Peter N. Silvestri, a Republican, was reelected.

Primaries

Democratic

Republican

General election

10th district

Incumbent second-term commissioner Maria Pappas, a Democrat, did not seek reelection, instead opting to run for Cook County Treasurer. Democrat Mike Quigley was elected to succeed her in office.

Primaries

Democratic

Republican
No candidates ran in the Republican primary.

General election

11th district

Incumbent commissioner John P. Daley, a Democrat in office since 1992, was reelected.

Primaries

Democratic

Republican

General election

12th district

Incumbent third-term commissioner Ted Lechowicz, a Democrat, was reelected.

Primaries

Democratic

Republican
No candidates, ballot-certified or formal write-in, ran in the Republican primary.

General election

13th district

Incumbent first-term Commissioner Calvin Sutker, a Democrat, was reelected.

Primaries

Democratic

Republican
No candidates ran in the Republican primary.

General election

14th district

Incumbent commissioner Richard Siebel, a Republican, did not seek reelection. Republican Gregg Goslin was elected to succeed him.

Primaries

Democratic
No candidates ran in the Democratic primary.

Republican

General election

15th district

Incumbent sixth-term commissioner Carl Hansen, a Republican, was reelected.

Primaries

Democratic

Republican

General election

16th district

Incumbent Commissioner Allan C. Carr, a Republican, was reelected.

Primaries

Democratic

Republican

General election
Democrat nominee John E. Bertone withdrew and was not replaced on the ballot.

17th district

Incumbent third-term commissioner Herb Schumann, a Republican, was reelected.

Primaries

Democratic

Republican

General election

Cook County Board of Review

In the 1998 Cook County Board of Review election, all three seats were up for election. This was the first election for what would be a newly reconstituted body. In 1996, the Illinois Legislature successfully passed Public Act 89-671, which made it so that, in 1998, the Cook County Board of Appeals would be renamed Cook County Board of Review and be reconstituted as a three-member body.

All elections held in 1998 were for four-year terms.

1st district

Republican Maureen Murphy defeated Democrat David B. McAfee.

Primaries

Democratic

Republican

General election

2nd district

Joseph Berrios a ten incumbent on the predecessor organization, the Cook County Board of (Tax) Appeals, was elected, running unopposed in both the Democratic primary and general election.

Primaries

Democratic

Republican
No candidates ran in the Republican primary.

General election

3rd district

Robert Shaw, a Democrat, was elected.

Primaries

Democratic

Republican
No candidates ran in the Republican primary.

General election

Water Reclamation District Board 

In the 1998 Metropolitan Water Reclamation District of Greater Chicago  election, four of the nine seats on the Metropolitan Water Reclamation District of Greater Chicago board were up for election. Three were regularly scheduled elections, and one was a special election due to a vacancy.

Democrats won all four seats up for election.

Democratic incumbents Gloria Alitto Majewski and Patricia Young were reelected in the at-large election.

At-large election
Three six-year term seats were up for an at-large election. Since three six-year seats were up for election, voters could vote for up to three candidates, and the top-three finishers would win.

Primaries

Democratic

Republican

General election

Unexpired term
A special election was held to fill a seat left vacant.

Primaries

Democratic

Republican

General election

Judicial elections
Partisan elections were held for judgeships on the Circuit Court of Cook County, due to vacancies. Other judgeships had retention elections.

Partisan elections were also held for subcircuit courts judgeships due to vacancies. Other judgeships had retention elections.

Ballot questions 
One ballot question was included on ballots county-wide during the March primary election.

Managed Care Act advisory referendum
An advisory referendum was included on the March primary ballots on the Managed Care Act.

Other elections
Coinciding with the primaries, elections were held to elect both the Democratic and Republican committeemen for the suburban townships.

See also 
 1998 Illinois elections

References 

Cook County
Cook County, Illinois elections
Cook County 1998
Cook County
Cook County, Illinois elections